Edward Austin  may refer to:

Edward Austin (cricketer) (1847–1891), English cricketer
Edward Austin (politician) (1875–1940), Australian politician
Edward Oramel Austin (1825–1909) American pioneer
Ed Austin (1926–2011), American attorney and politician
Ned Austin (1925–2007), American actor
Edward Austin Kent (1854–1912), American architect
Edward Austin Sheldon (1823–1897), American educator

See also